Serge Marc Cantat (born 3 June 1973, in Paris) is a French mathematician, specializing in geometry and dynamical systems.

Cantat received his PhD under the supervision of Étienne Ghys in 1999 at the École normale supérieure de Lyon. Cantat is a directeur de recherche of CNRS at the Institut de recherches mathématiques de Rennes (University of Rennes 1). He was previously directeur de recherche of CNRS at ENS Paris.

His research deals with complex dynamics and dynamics of automorphisms of algebraic surfaces. He examined the algebraic structure of Cremona groups (i.e. groups of birational automorphisms of -dimensional projective spaces over a field ) and showed with Stéphane Lamy that for an algebraically closed field  and for dimension =2 the Cremona group  is not a simple group. In particular, if  is the field of complex numbers and =2, the Cremona group contains an infinite non-countable family of different normal subgroups.

In 2018, Cantat was an invited speaker at the International Congress of Mathematicians in Rio de Janeiro. In 2012 he received the Prix Paul Doistau–Émile Blutet for his work on dynamic systems (and especially holomorphic dynamic systems). In 2012 he was an invited speaker at the European Congress of Mathematics in Kraków. In 2012 he was awarded the Prix La Recherche.

Selected publications
 Dynamique des automorphismes des surfaces K3, Acta Math., Vol. 187, 2001, pp. 1–57. 
 with C. Favre: Symétries birationnelles des surfaces feuilletées, J. Reine Ange. Math., Vol. 561, 2003, pp. 199–235, Arxiv
 Endomorphismes des variétés homogènes, L'Enseignement Math., Vol. 49, 2004, pp. 237–262
 Difféomorphismes holomorphes Anosov, Commentarii Math. Helvetici, vol. 79, 2004, pp. 779–797 
 with Frank Loray: Holomorphic dynamics, Painlevé VI equation, and character varieties, Annales de l'Institut Fourier, Vol. 59, 2009, pp. 2927–2978, Arxiv
 Bers and Hénon, Painlevé and Schroedinger, Duke Math. Journal, Vol. 149, 2009, pp. 411–460, Arxiv
 with Antoine Chambert-Loir, Vincent Guedj: Quelques aspects des systèmes dynamiques polynomiaux, Panorama et Synthèse, Volume 30, Société Math. de France 2010
 In Cantat's introduction, the chapter  Quelques aspects des systèmes dynamiques polynomiaux, existence, exemples, rigidité , pp. 13–96, with Chambert-Loir: Dynamique p-adique (d'après les exposés de Jean-Christophe Yoccoz) , p. 295 (Arxiv)
 with Abdelghani Zeghib: Holomorphic Actions, Kummer Examples, and Zimmer Program, Annales Scientifique de l'ENS, Vol. 45, 2012, pp. 447–489, Arxiv
 Sur les groupes de transformations birationnelles des surfaces, Annals of Math., Vol. 174, 2012, pp. 299–334 
 with Igor Dolgachev: Rational Surfaces with a Large Group of Automorphisms, J. Amer. Math. Soc., Vol. 25, 2012, pp. 863–905. Arxiv
 Dynamics of automorphisms of compact complex surfaces, in: Frontiers in Complex Dynamics: In celebration of John Milnor's 80th birthday, Princeton Mathematical Series, Princeton University Press, 2012, pp. 463–514
 with Stéphane Lamy: Normal subgroups of the Cremona group, Acta Mathematica, Vol. 210, 2013, pp. 31–94, Arxiv

References

External links
 Homepage
 Portrait at Espaces des Sciences
 Essays on Images of the Mathématiques of the CNRS
 
 
  
 

20th-century French mathematicians
21st-century French mathematicians
1973 births
Living people
Prix Paul Doistau–Émile Blutet laureates